Sosnovka is a rural locality (a selo) and the administrative centre of Sosnovsky Selsoviet, Beloretsky District, Bashkortostan, Russia. The population was 723 as of 2010. There are 18  streets.

Geography 
Sosnovka is located 19 km southwest of Beloretsk (the district's administrative centre) by road. Arsky Kamen is the nearest rural locality.

References 

Rural localities in Beloretsky District